The UNCITRAL Model Law on Cross-Border Insolvency was a model law issued by the secretariat of UNCITRAL on 30 May 1997 to assist states in relation to the regulation of corporate insolvency and financial distress involving companies which have assets or creditors in more than one state.

At present 23 jurisdictions have substantially adopted the Model Law.

Purpose

The to the Model Law provides:

The Model Law is designed to provide a model framework to encourage cooperation and coordination between jurisdictions.  Despite earlier proposals to do so, it does not attempt to unify substantive insolvency laws, and the Model Law respects the differences among the substantive and procedural laws of states.

The Model Law defines a cross-border insolvency is one where the insolvent debtor has assets in more than one state, or where some of the creditors of the debtor are not from the state where the insolvency proceeding is taking place.

UNCITRAL published the Model Law in response to concerns that the number of cross-border insolvency cases had increased significantly during the 1990s, but national and international legal regimes equipped to address the issues raised by those cases has not evolved at a similar pace.  The absence of effective cross-border insolvency regimes was thought to have resulted in inadequate and uncoordinated approaches to cross-border insolvency which were both unpredictable and time-consuming in their application, lacking both transparency and the tools necessary to address the disparities between different national laws.  As a result, it had become difficult to protect the residual value of the assets of financially troubled businesses, and impeded corporate rescue culture for cross-border entities.

Methodology

Rather than prescribing a single set of rules for all states to adopt, the Model Law focuses on trying to:
 Identify the most relevant jurisdiction in relation to a cross-border insolvency (called the "foreign main proceeding");
 Ensure that insolvency officials from that jurisdiction are recognised in other states; and
 Ensure that other states provide the necessary cooperation to facilitate the insolvency process in the principal jurisdiction.

In order to identify the principal jurisdiction, the Model Law utilises the "centre of main interest" (or COMI) concept.  The working assumption is that any international business will nonetheless have a centre of main interest, where the principal insolvency should take place.  As far as possible the assets and claims should be channeled back to that main jurisdiction, and all other jurisdictions should seek to limit the exercise of their insolvency regimes to assisting with the liquidation of assets in their countries, the staying of claims, the redirecting of claims back to the principal jurisdiction.  The basis of the Model Law is sometimes referred to as modified universalism.

The Model Law defines a foreign proceeding as "a collective judicial or administrative proceeding in a foreign State, including an interim proceeding, pursuant to a law relating to insolvency in which proceeding the assets and affairs of the debtor are subject to control or supervision by a foreign court, for the purpose of reorganization or liquidation".  Accordingly, a number of regimes relating to the enforcement of security interests (such as receivership and administrative receivership) are not caught.  Similarly, a number of debtor-in-possession rehabilitation and reorganisational processes which do not require the intervention of the courts are similarly not caught.

The Model Law recognises the risk that certain provisions of one state's insolvency laws may be repugnant to another state, and creates a public policy exception in relation to foreign laws, although the guidance notes express the hope that this would be utilised rarely in commercial insolvency matters.

The Model Law also seeks to limit insolvency regimes which favour domestic creditors over foreign ones.

Countries

The following countries have substantially implemented the Model Law into their domestic legislation.

Footnotes

See also
 Cross-border insolvency

External links
 Text of the Model Law and Guide to Enforcement
 Judicial Perspectives on the Model Law

Cross-border insolvency
Bankruptcy
Uniform Acts